Rodrigo Uprimny Yepes (born April 13, 1959, in Bogota) is a Colombian legal scholar. He is currently a member of the United Nations Committee on Economic, Social and Cultural Rights and the International Commission of Jurists. He is a researcher at Dejusticia, an NGO he directed for ten years. He writes for the Colombian newspaper El Espectador.

References 

Colombian lawyers
International law scholars
Living people
1959 births